The 2013–14 Primera B Nacional was the 28th season of professional Argentine second division. For this season, the total teams was raised to 22; the champion, runner-up and winner of the tiebreaker playoff were promoted to Primera División.

Club information

Standings

Tiebreaker Playoff
Since Huracán and Independiente finished tied in points,  a one-match playoff had to be held to determine who promoted to Primera División. The match was played on June 11 at Estadio Único in La Plata. The winner was Independiente by winning 2–0.

Results

Relegation

The bottom two teams of this table faced relegation. Clubs with an indirect affiliation with Argentine Football Association are relegated to the Torneo Argentino A, while clubs directly affiliated face relegation to Primera B Metropolitana.

Updated to games played on 8 June 2014.

Season statistics

Top scorers

See also
2013–14 in Argentine football

References

External links

Football-Lineups

2013–14 in Argentine football leagues
Primera B Nacional seasons
Arg
Arg